Revelelva is the native name of the lowest part of the river Tverråga, which has its outlet in Ranelva in Rana municipality in Nordland county, Norway. The river change its name at the bridge connecting European route E6 with Gruben. Before this bridge it is called Tverråga. Passing this bridge, it is called Revelelva.

Media gallery

See also
List of rivers in Norway

References

Rana, Norway
Rivers of Nordland
Rivers of Norway